Kušionová v SMART Capital a.s. (2014) Case C-34/13 is an EU law and consumer protection case, concerning the Unfair Terms in Consumer Contracts Directive. It emphasises the foundations of consumer protection on inequality of bargaining power and imbalances in information.

Facts
Mrs Monika Kušionová claimed that a contract term allowing a bank to take possession of her home without court review was unfair under the Unfair Terms in Consumer Contracts Directive. She had taken out a loan of €10,000 from Smart Capital, secured on her home in Slovakia. The charge allowed for enforcement without any review by a court. This term derived from the Civi Code §151j. Before the hearing and judgment of the ECJ, the Slovak legislature had amended the Code to allow for review by a court.

Judgment

Slovak courts
The District Court held that some of the terms were unfair, including the charge agreement. The Regional Court made a reference, asking whether a term deriving from a statutory provision could be regarded as unfair under the Unfair Contract Terms Directive 93/13/EC.

European Court of Justice
The Court of Justice held that if national law allowed for a court review of unfair terms before the loss of property, and a complete remedy, then legislation allowing recovery of a debt is not precluded. It said the legal context of the dispute included the Charter article 7, which requires 'Everyone has the right to respect for his or her private and family life' and article 38 requires a high level of consumer protection.

See also

EU law
English contract law

Notes

References

Court of Justice of the European Union case law
2014 in case law